Cherniavskyi, Cherniavska is a Ukrainian family name. Notable people with the surname include:

 Dmytro Cherniavskyi (born 1971), Ukrainian politician
 Ivan Cherniavskyi (1930–2001), Ukrainian Soviet Olympic athlete
 Serhii Cherniavskyi (born 1976), Ukrainian cyclist

See also
 
 Cherniavsky (disambiguation)
 Czerniawski

References

Ukrainian-language surnames